The Wood Mansion House, also known as the David Wood Mansion, is a historic stone house located at 821 Columbia Avenue in the city of Millville in Cumberland County, New Jersey. The oldest section of the house was built  by David C. Wood. It was documented by the Historic American Buildings Survey in 1992. The mansion was added to the National Register of Historic Places on December 24, 2013, for its significance in the area of industry from 1814 to 1926.

History and description
Industrialist David C. Wood (1781–1859) built an iron furnace here by the Maurice River in 1814. The two-story house was built in three sections. The first was built  in Federal style, the second  built by George Wood (1842–1926) with Italianate style, and the third .

See also
 National Register of Historic Places listings in Cumberland County, New Jersey

References

External links
 
 

Millville, New Jersey
Stone houses in New Jersey
Houses completed in 1814
1814 establishments in New Jersey
Houses in Cumberland County, New Jersey
Houses on the National Register of Historic Places in New Jersey
National Register of Historic Places in Cumberland County, New Jersey
New Jersey Register of Historic Places
Historic American Buildings Survey in New Jersey